Holly Brisley (born 11 January 1978) is an Australian actress and television presenter. She began her career at the age of 16 on Agro's Cartoon Connection (1994–97) and more recently portrayed Amanda Vale-Baker on Home and Away (2005–09). Her most successful film roles include Garage Days (2001) and The Crop (2002).

Early life
Brisley was born in Adelaide, South Australia, Australia. As Holly grew up, she excelled at speech and drama and joined the Paradise Performer's Dance Academy, where she participated in various classes such as jazz, ballet and tap dancing, and also took part in eisteddfods, winning many awards.

Career
By the age of 13 she was on the books of the Studio Search Agency on the Gold Coast, with her first roles being the Australian telemovies The Flood: Who Will Save Our Children? in 1993 and Official Denial in 1994.

It was not until Holly began her regular television career in 1994 on the Logie Award winning children's program Agro's Cartoon Connection that she began to receive recognition. She would later host The Looney Tunes Show in a more adult style, along with World's Craziest Videos and various shows for Foxtel. Holly was ranked 5th (2000) and 29th (2001) in FHM'''s Australia's 100 Sexiest Women.

Brisley maintained her acting career throughout this period with some of her notable roles being in Garage Days, The Crop and Dynasty: The Making of a Guilty Pleasure.

After various guest appearances and hosting gigs, Holly was featured in Dancing with the Stars in 2005, and then landed the permanent role of town vixen Amanda Vale on soap opera Home and Away, where she remained for two years. In February 2008, Holly briefly returned to Home and Away, reprising her role again in July 2009 and leaving in mid August 2009. Holly has said she would love to return to Home and Away.

Over the years, Holly has worked (at one stage or another) for most networks, including Channel 10 and Foxtel, but mostly she has worked for Channel 7 and 9.

In 2008, Holly voiced the title character in the ABC children's series CJ the DJ which has screened in Australia from late 2009 to early 2010. Holly played the female lead Tara in the feature film Sinbad and the Minotaur (2011).

In November 2019, she appeared on 7mate in the reincarnation of Fat Pizza, as Pauly's former high school crush, who works in the local pharmacy.

Personal life
Brisley's family moved from Adelaide to the Gold Coast while she was still very young.

Holly became engaged to marketing executive Paul Ford in Venice in 2005 and they married on 11 February 2006 in Manly, Sydney. They exchanged vows in the Cardinal Cerretti Memorial Chapel, in the grounds of St Patrick's Seminary overlooking the ocean.

Holly gave birth to their son, Levi Harper Ford, at the Royal North Shore Private Hospital on 16 July 2009. On 20 July 2012 Holly gave birth to the couples second child, a daughter Willow Jade Ford.

Holly has Coeliac Disease, and appeared on the cover of "The Australian Coeliac" September 2005 edition.

In July 2010, Holly climbed Mount Kilimanjaro in Africa for a charity trek, whereby she raised $50,000 for the Humpty Dumpty Foundation, a worthy cause that helps sick children. She had a near death experience having contracted pulmonary edema caused by the high altitude but is in good health now.

Awards and nominations
On 1 June 2005, she received a Film Award for 'Best Actress – Feature Film' at the New York Film & Video Festival for her portrayal of "Geraldine" in the Australian film The Crop''. The movie also won 'Best International Feature'.

Filmography

References

External links
 
 
 Yahoo Fan Group
 Fan Tribute Page
 What A Girl Needs interview with Holly Brisley

1978 births
Australian film actresses
Australian soap opera actresses
Actresses from Adelaide
Living people
Australian children's television presenters
Australian women television presenters